The 1965 All-Ireland Senior Camogie Championship Final was the 34th All-Ireland Final and the deciding match of the 1965 All-Ireland Senior Camogie Championship, an inter-county camogie tournament for the top teams in Ireland.

Tipperary had the wind in the first half, and were only two down shortly after the break, but four quick Dublin goals ended the game as a contest. Judy Doyle scored five goals.

References

All-Ireland Senior Camogie Championship Final
All-Ireland Senior Camogie Championship Final
All-Ireland Senior Camogie Championship Final, 1965
All-Ireland Senior Camogie Championship Finals
Dublin county camogie team matches
Tipperary county camogie team matches